Tetlepanquetzal (died 1525) was the fourth Tepanec  (ruler) of Tlacopan, and reigned after 1503 as a tributary of the Mexican emperor Moctezuma II, whom he assisted in the first defence of Mexico. Afterward he was one of the principal auxiliaries of Cuauhtémoc. When the city was finally taken, 13 August, 1521, he was made prisoner and tortured, together with Cuauhtémoc, by the Spaniards to coerce them into revealing the hiding place of the imperial treasure.

Tetlepanquetzal was present when Hernán Cortés met Moctezuma II for the first time.

Death

When Hernán Cortés marched in October, 1524 to Honduras to subdue the revolt of Cristóbal de Olid, he carried Tetlepanquetzal with him, in addition to the Aztec emperor Cuauhtémoc, and another , Coanacotzin (of Texcoco), for fear of an insurgency while he was away. During the expedition, under the pretext that he had discovered a conspiracy against him, Cortés had all three strangled or hanged, with others, during Lent, 1525.

References

 

1525 deaths
Aztec nobility
Executed monarchs
Executed Mexican people
People executed by New Spain
Mexican torture victims
People executed by Spain by hanging
Year of birth unknown

Nobility of the Americas